Minhwa refers to Korean folk art produced mostly by itinerant or unknown artists without formal training, emulating contemporary trends in fine art for the purpose of everyday use or decoration. The term "minhwa" was coined by Yanagi Muneyoshi.

Minhwa literally means "painting of the people" or "popular painting". This type of painting was often the work of anonymous craftsmen who faithfully adhered to the styles, canons and genres inherited from the past. Minhwa also involved a magical dimension. They were believed to possess beneficial virtues and to protect the owner and his family from evil forces. They feature popular themes such as cranes, rocks, water, clouds, the sun, moon, pine-trees, tortoises, insects and flowers.  Minhwa means popular painting or people’s art and is traditional Korean folk art from the Chosun era (1392-1910) painted onto paper or on canvas.  Yoon (2020) mentions that “Minhwa is a traditional art form that was intimately connected to the lives of the Korean people, so it best embodies the Korean sentiment” (p. 14). 

Minhwa began being used in palaces by royal court painters before anonymous artists adopted and dispersed their art to the populace to convey messages, ward away evil spirits, and wish for good things to happen.  Minhwa art developed into its present form in the seventeenth century.  The artists were common people who went from place to place, often following festivals, where they would paint for the locals, fulfilling their commissions on the spot.   The artists are mostly unknown commoners of the low and middle class and some were traveling visitors usually attending festivals who followed trends in fine art to develop the crude minhwa style artwork that expressed its emotions using symbolism, optimism, humor, and satire. Important stages in life were also marked by the painting of a minhwa picture.  Both common people and nobles would commission these artists.

The paintings worked on a number of levels.  They show figures from folk mythology and legends, symbols of happiness, wealth and health, and scenes of everyday life.  The most common figures were animals that represented power, such as the tiger, or providential circumstances, such as carp, which represent success. The paintings were done on paper and on canvas.   

Minhwa colorfully represents the perspectives, religions, symbols of daily life and desires, and folk mythologies of its time. It featured robust animals as supernatural such as tigers, dragons, insects, and cranes, and featured colorful natural backgrounds with peonies, clouds, lotuses, water, or the sun.  The unique symbolism blended Buddhism, shamanism, Confucianism, and Taoism.   

After a decline during the colonial rule, the art form experienced a short boom until laid low by the Korean War.  In the 1980s, though, there was a revival of Minhwa, the interest and popularity of which persists to this day.

Minhwa was hanged by the front door to bring about happiness and luck.  Minhwa was a detailed process from scratch.  It consisted of making the pigments from natural ingredients and coloring hanji, or Korean paper. 

Minhwa is still around, but can mostly be seen at museums, as street art in older neighborhoods, and crafts.  It is seen on the hanbok, folding screens, tee shirts, car stickers, dishes, fans, and more.  Minwha’s simplistic, yet brilliant style and unconventionality combined with bold colors make it aesthetically important and a strong expression of the daily lives of Koreans.  The combined wit, humor, happiness, informality, exaggerations similar to caricatures, and freedom of expression aligns even with contemporary art pieces to exhibit an understanding of Korean culture.

Some famous known minhwa artists are Oh Soon-Kyung, a modern professional, Jung Seung Hui also a modern professional, Seongmin Ahn, Yi Am who was the great-grandson of King Sejong, Sin Saimdang, Kim Sik, and Byeon Sangbyeok.

Genres
There are several categories of minhwa art styles. Morando showcased paintings of peonies that were popular with ceremonies, marriages, and royal events. Morando was the most popular and represented honor and wealth. Yunhwa-do were paintings of lotuses to represent noble characters and included fish, birds, and insects. Lotus and ducks represented familial happiness, marital love, and were used for decorations.

Chaekgeori was the popular book and stationary paintings and Munjado is paintings of Chinese characters.  Hwajodo was paintings of flowers and birds such as the peacock that represented advancement. Flowers and butterflies seen in Hwajodo styles represented hope for love and domestic unity between married couples, harmony, and balance. It also encouraged prosperity and relates to shamanism’s protective features.  Religion was exhibited in Ssanghak pandodo with a painting of two cranes and peaches to symbolize Korean Taoism.

Hojakdo is paintings of tigers, magpies, and pine trees with the Hopeedo style featuring paintings of tiger stripes. The tiger imagery indicated government and was drawn to look less fearsome. Magpies were drawn to bring good news or friendly company.  Chochungdo is paintings of flowers and insects. Yongsudo is the paintings of divine animals. Furry animals were represented in the Yeongmodo paintings.  Fish, as seen in Eohaedo paintings, symbolized fertility, warded off and warned of evil, and could be found in a bride’s room.  Sipjangsaengdo was the painting of the ten symbols of longevity. Sogwado showcased vegetables and fruits that symbolized the continued family lineage.  The representation of longevity included images of the sun, clouds, rocks, pine trees, bamboos, deer, and turtles, mountains, fish, peaches, or the moon.  Chung (2006) noted that “in the case of animal imagery, this strong preference for conveying warm relations must also have developed through the affection for various living things in nature that were held by the artists themselves” (p. 65).

Yonghodo is paintings of powerful animals such as the tiger and dragon who protected people from bad luck.  The royal court artists created paintings of the sun and moon over trees (Ilwolbusangdo) early in the Choson era to signify royal protection over all of the people.

Magpie and tiger

Kkachi horangi is a prominent genre of minhwa that depicts magpies and tigers. In kkachi horangi paintings, the tiger, which is intentionally given a ridiculous and stupid appearance (hence its nickname "idiot tiger" 바보호랑이), represents authority and the aristocratic yangban, while the dignified magpie represents the common man. Hence, kkachi horangi paintings of magpies and tigers were a satire of the hierarchical structure of Joseon's feudal society.

Flower writing
Munjado, also known as "flower writing", is a genre of minhwa that enjoyed popularity in the 18th and 19th centuries, in which large Chinese characters associated with Confucian philosophy are painted as a representation of their meaning, with depictions of related stories and themes painted into the characters themselves.

Chaekgeori
Chaekgeori is a genre of still-life painting that features books as the dominant subject. Originally a court art embraced by the upper class, chaekgeori spread to the minhwa folk art of the common class in the 19th century, resulting in more expressionist and abstract depictions, and the diminished prominence of bookshelves as a primary motif.

Literature
 Korean Tiger:  An Exhibition of Korean Folk Painting; To Commemorate the Dedication of the Olympic stadium; Seoul, Sept.29-Oct.14, 1984. Zayong Zo [editor].  Seoul: Emilie Museum, 1984.
 Yoon, Yul Soo, 2005, Minhwa, designhouse.

Gallery

References
7. Chung, S. P. (2006). Turning toward Each Other: Warmth and Intimacy in Chosŏn-Dynasty Animal Paintings. Acta Koreana, 9(1), 53–87.

8.  Yoon Yul-soo. (2020). My Love of Minhwa. Koreana, 34(4), 12–15.

Korean art
Korean painting